Reichskommissariat is a German word for a type of administrative entity headed by a government official known as a Reichskommissar. However, many offices existed, primarily throughout the Imperial German and Nazi periods, in a number of fields (ranging from public infrastructure and spatial planning to ethnic cleansing) it is most commonly used to refer to the quasi-colonial administrative territorial entity established by Nazi Germany in several occupied countries during World War II. While officially located outside the German Reich in a legal sense, these entities were directly controlled by their supreme civil authorities (the Reichskommissars), who ruled their territories as German governors on behalf of and as representatives of Adolf Hitler.

The introduction of these territorial administrations served a number of purposes. Those established or planned to be established in Western and Northern Europe were in general envisioned as the transitional phases for the incorporation of Germanic countries outside pre-war Germany into an expanded Nazi state. Their eastern counterparts served primarily colonialist and imperialist purposes, as sources of Lebensraum for German settlement and the exploitation of natural resources.

Another contrast was the level of administrative overhaul implemented in these two types. As in most other territories conquered by the Germans, local administrators and bureaucrats were pressured to continue their regular day-to-day operations (especially at the middle and lower levels) albeit under German oversight. Throughout the war, the Reichskommissariate in Western and Northern Europe retained the existing administrative structure, while in the eastern ones, new structures were introduced. All of these entities were intended for eventual integration into a Greater Germanic Reich encompassing the general area of Europe stretching from the North Sea to the Ural Mountains, for which Germany was to form the basis.

Western and Northern Europe
 Reichskommissariat Norwegen (German occupation of Norway between 1940 and 1945).
 Reichskommissariat Niederlande (German occupation of Netherlands between 1940 and 1945).
 Reichskommissariat Belgien-Nordfrankreich (German occupation of Belgium and North France, Nord-Pas-de-Calais, in 1944. Retrospectively annexed directly into the Greater German Reich in December 1944 as the new Reichsgaue of Flanders, Wallonia and Brussels, although most of the region was no longer under German control at the time.)

Formerly Soviet-ruled territories

In the summer of 1941, German Nazi-ideologist Alfred Rosenberg suggested that to facilitate the break-up of the Soviet Union and Russia as a geographical entity, conquered Soviet territory should be administered in the following five Reichskommissariaten: 
 Reichskommissariat Ostland (RKO) (formerly Soviet-annexed Estonia, Latvia, Lithuania, except Memel, and Soviet Belarus, except Gomel') 1941–1945.
 Reichskommissariat Ukraine (RKU) (formerly Soviet Ukraine and Rostov, minus District of Galicia, Odessa, Vinnytsia and the Crimea); 1941–1944.
 Reichskommissariat Don-Wolga (approximately from the Sea of Azov to the Volga German Republic including Rostov, Voronezh, and Saratov; late May 1941 divided between Ukraine, Moskowien and Kaukasus); never established.
 Reichskommissariat Moskowien (RKM) (European Russia, minus Karelia and the Kola peninsula, promised to Finland); never fully established. German military advance halted in 1941/42.
 Reichskommissariat Kaukasus (RKK) (Southern Russia and the Caucasus area, except the western part of Georgia and the whole Armenia); never fully established. German military advance halted in 1942/43.
 Reichskommissariat Turkestan (RKT) (Central Asian republics and territories); never established.

At Hitler's request, the Turkestan project was shelved by Rosenberg for the immediate future, who was instead ordered to focus on Europe for the time being. Central Asia was determined to be a future target for German expansion, as soon as its armies would be ready to move further east after the consolidation of present victories in Soviet Russia. The interest in part of the area of Germany's major Axis partner, the Empire of Japan (see Axis power negotiations on the division of Asia during World War II), could have become a topic of discussion regarding their own contemporaneous establishment of the Greater East Asia Co-Prosperity Sphere.

Additional units that were under discussion at different points in time include Reichskommissariat Don-Wolga but, by the second half of May 1941, the number of administrative units that were to be established in the east was limited to four; as well as a Reichskommissariat Ural for the central and southern Ural region.

References

External links
 Evolution of Alfred Rosenberg's territorial planning for the conquered Soviet territories

Subdivisions of Nazi Germany
Types of administrative division